Cores (Portuguese for "Colors") is a 2012 Brazilian drama film that was released on May 10, 2013. It is the debut film of director Francisco Garcia, who also wrote the script together with Gabriel Campos.

The film was premiered at the 60th San Sebastián International Film Festival in 2012, and was also screened at the 36th São Paulo International Film Festival.

Plot 
The film follows the story of the friendship among three young friends in a metropolis. Luca is a tattoo artist who lives with his grandmother. He keeps a tattoo studio in the back of the house, in a peripheral district of São Paulo. Luiz lives in a pension in the downtown city, he spends the day between small jobs that he manages with his bike and working in a drugstore. Luara, his girlfriend, is a girl who lives in an apartment in front of the airport and works in an ornamental fish shop, while dreaming of traveling abroad. The life of these three friends are marked by an ordinary routine, in which the lack of perspective prevails.

Cast 
 Maria Célia Camargo		
 Graça De Andrade	
 Pedro di Pietro		
 Simone Iliesco		
 Guilherme Leme		
 Tonico Pereira		
 Acauã Sol

References

External links
 
 

Brazilian drama films
2012 directorial debut films
2012 films
Films shot in São Paulo
2012 drama films
2010s Portuguese-language films